Aleardo Simoni (5 September 1902 – 8 September 1989) was an Italian racing cyclist. He rode in the 1932 Tour de France.

References

External links
 

1902 births
1989 deaths
Italian male cyclists
Place of birth missing
Cyclists from Milan